Park Hae-min (Hangul: 박해민, born February 24, 1990, in Seoul) is a South Korean outfielder for the LG Twins in the Korea Baseball Organization. He bats left-handed and throws right-handed.

Amateur career
Upon graduation from Shinil High School in Seoul, Park was eligible for the  KBO Draft but went undrafted. Instead, he entered Hanyang University to continue to play baseball.

In , Park was moved to the lead-off role right after the team's four-year lead-off hitter Ko Jong-wook graduated. In July 2011, Park won the batting title with a .452 batting average at the 2011 National Summer League Championship, going 14-for-31 as the team's lead-off hitter. Park finished his last collegiate season with a career-best .429 batting average (which was ranked first in the 2011 national collegiate season), 11 RBIs, and 7 stolen bases.

Professional career

2012 KBO Draft
When Park, the 2011 college batting champion, made himself eligible for the KBO draft after his senior season at Hanyang University, many expected him to be an early-round pick. However, some scouting reports highlighted his lack of prototypical height and inability to hit home runs and questioned his defensive abilities, and Park was not called in the  KBO Draft. A week later, he signed with the Samsung Lions as an undrafted free agent.

Samsung Lions
In 2012, Park played his professional rookie season with the Lions' farm-league affiliate. In the 2012 KBO Futures League for the reserve teams, he batted .254 with 20 RBIs and 3 stolen bases. Park made his first KBO League appearance on September 13, 2013, as a pinch runner for Choi Hyoung-woo, who had singled, but did not score.

In 2014 Park had a breakout season, making 119 appearances as a starting center fielder for the Lions, and batting .297 with 31 RBIs and 36 stolen bases. He was ranked fifth overall in stolen bases and third in the 2014 KBO Rookie of the Year Award.

International career
In September 2011, Park was called up to the South Korea national baseball team for the 2011 Baseball World Cup held in Panama. Park went 3-for-4 in the Team Korea's first game against Venezuela. He hit a game-tying three-run homer off Darío Veras in the ninth inning of the Team Korea's last Round 1 game against Dominican Republic, which ended with a Korea's 5-4 victory.

In 2018, he represented South Korea at the 2018 Asian Games.

References

External links

Career statistics and player information from the KBO League

1990 births
Living people
Baseball players at the 2018 Asian Games
Baseball players at the 2020 Summer Olympics
Asian Games gold medalists for South Korea
Medalists at the 2018 Asian Games
Asian Games medalists in baseball
KBO League outfielders
LG Twins players
Samsung Lions players
South Korean baseball players
Baseball players from Seoul
Olympic baseball players of South Korea
2023 World Baseball Classic players